Jörgen Häggqvist (born 9 July 1962) is a Swedish judoka. He competed at the 1984 Summer Olympics and the 1992 Summer Olympics.

References

1962 births
Living people
Swedish male judoka
Olympic judoka of Sweden
Judoka at the 1984 Summer Olympics
Judoka at the 1992 Summer Olympics
Sportspeople from Gothenburg
20th-century Swedish people